Sanders County is a county in the U.S. state of Montana. As of the 2020 census, the population was 12,400. Its county seat is Thompson Falls. The county was founded in 1905.

It has an annual county fair with rodeo at Plains.

Geography

Sanders County lies on the state's western border; thus it shares the border with Idaho to the west. It is part of the Coeur d'Alene Mountains in the Bitterroot Range. The Clark Fork River flows southeast to northwest through the middle of the county, with the Bitterroot Mountains to the south and the Cabinet Mountains to the north.

It is partially arid, with the west-facing mountain slopes capturing the most rain: ranging from nearly 40 inches a year in Heron (similar to Seattle's annual precipitation) on the Western end of the county to less than 12 inches per year in Dixon on the East end.

During the last ice age, this was the area that dammed the glacial Lake Missoula. When the ice dam broke, the resulting floods created the Scablands in eastern Washington.

Adjacent counties

 Lincoln County – north
 Flathead County – northeast
 Lake County – east
 Missoula County – southeast
 Mineral County – south
 Shoshone County, Idaho – west/Pacific Time Border
 Bonner County, Idaho – northwest/Pacific Time Border

National protected areas

 Kaniksu National Forest (part)
 Kootenai National Forest (part)
 Lolo National Forest (part)
 Bison Range (part)

Fauna
A variety of birds and other wildlife are found in Sanders County. The Tufted duck has been observed along the Bull River. An amphibian, the Rough-skinned Newt, has a disjunctive population at Thompson Falls which is un-contiguous with the remainder of the Western United States population of this species.

Sanders County is a "destination hunting locale" with trophy specimens of White-tailed Deer (Odocoileus virginianus), Mule Deer (Odocoileus hemionus), Rocky Mountain Elk (Cervus canadensis nelsoni), Shiras Moose (Alces alces Shirasi), Mountain Goat(Oreamnos americanus), and Bighorn Sheep (Ovis canadensis Canadensis) rounding out huntable ungulate species and Black Bear, Cougar and Wolves comprising the huntable carnivores.

Rocky Mountain Bighorns are regularly hunted in the county. Grizzly bear, the Montana state animal, are also found in the county, but as an endangered species, hunting them is prohibited. Montana had the last huntable population of Grizzlies in the lower 48, allowing 10 bears a year (natural deaths, poaching and other causes of death were included in that total to decide when season closed) as late as the 1990s. Only Alaska allows hunting for Grizzlies at present.

Western Meadowlark, the state bird are found sparsely in the meadow areas of Sanders County along with Redwing Blackbird and Mountain Bluebirds.

The westslope cutthroat trout (Onchorynchus clarki lewisi) is native to the drainages of Sanders County. The threatened native bull trout relies on westslopes as a major prey species in its piscivorous diet. Catch and release fishing is required to maintain fishable populations of the two natives, which now compete with introduced rainbow trout, and warm-water species, such as largemouth bass, yellow perch, Northern Pike, and walleyes that have been introduced and thrive in the modified habitat of the Clark Fork River's reservoirs.

Flora
Sanders County is part of the mountainous western third of Montana. It lies entirely on the western slopes of the Rocky Mountains with a mixed coniferous forest dominating the plant community. Douglas fir/Ponderosa pine (Montana state tree) climax plant community dominate much of the county, but there are numerous other conifers found there as well in pockets of micro-climates suited to their needs. These include Western red cedar, Western Hemlock, Mountain Hemlock, White Spruce, Subalpine Fir, Grand Fir, Western White Pine, Lodgepole Pine and one of the most spectacular, Western larch, one of a handful of deciduous conifers that turn gold in the autumn before dropping their needles.

Numerous broadleaf species proliferate in Sanders County: Rocky Mountain Maple, Red Alder, Paperbark Birch, Chokecherry, cottonwood, and poplar.

Arguably the most popular broad-leaf shrub in Sanders County is the Rocky Mountain huckleberry (Vaccinium membranaceum). Trout Creek, Montana 59874 is considered the "Huckleberry Capital of Montana" and holds an annual huckleberry celebration in August. Though related to the common blueberry (Vaccinium corymbosum) very few have managed to grow Rocky Mountain huckleberry in domestic cultivation. It is found in plant communities with beargrass (Xerophyllum tenax), a perennial found in burned or logged-over areas of the county's mountains.

The bitterroot (Lewisia rediviva), the state flower, is found in limited quantities in Sanders County.

Demographics

2000 census
As of the 2000 United States census there were 10,227 people, 4,273 households, and 2,897 families in the county. The population density was four people per square mile (1/km2). There were 5,271 housing units at an average density of two per square mile (1/km2). The racial makeup of the county was 91.91% White, 0.13% Black or African American, 4.74% Native American, 0.30% Asian, 0.01% Pacific Islander, 0.26% from other races, and 2.64% from two or more races. 1.55% of the population were Hispanic or Latino of any race. 20.1% were of German, 12.1% English, 11.0% Irish, 7.9% American and 6.5% Norwegian ancestry. 96.9% spoke English, 1.4% German and 1.2% Spanish as their first language.

There were 4,273 households, out of which 26.20% had children under the age of 18 living with them, 57.30% were married couples living together, 7.10% had a female householder with no husband present, and 32.20% were non-families. 28.00% of all households were made up of individuals, and 11.60% had someone living alone who was 65 years of age or older. The average household size was 2.35 and the average family size was 2.86.

The county population contained 23.80% under the age of 18, 5.50% from 18 to 24, 22.10% from 25 to 44, 31.80% from 45 to 64, and 16.90% who were 65 years of age or older. The median age was 44 years. For every 100 females there were 102.10 males. For every 100 females age 18 and over, there were 100.50 males.

The median income for a household in the county was $26,852, and the median income for a family was $31,340. Males had a median income of $28,340 versus $17,630 for females. The per capita income for the county was $14,593.  About 13.30% of families and 17.20% of the population were below the poverty line, including 23.30% of those under age 18 and 9.20% of those age 65 or over.

2010 census
As of the 2010 United States census, there were 11,413 people, 5,121 households, and 3,204 families residing in the county. The racial makeup of the county was 91.6% white, 4.4% American Indian, 0.3% Asian, 0.1% black or African American, 0.4% from other races, and 3.1% from two or more races. Those of Hispanic or Latino origin made up 2.0% of the population. In terms of ancestry, 32.2% were German, 16.4% were English, 16.1% were Irish, 9.1% were Norwegian, 6.3% were Swedish, and 3.3% were American.

Of the 5,121 households, 22.4% had children under the age of 18 living with them, 52.8% were married couples living together, 6.2% had a female householder with no husband present, 37.4% were non-families, and 32.8% of all households were made up of individuals. The average household size was 2.19 and the average family size was 2.75. The median age was 49.8 years.

The median income for a household in the county was $30,622 and the median income for a family was $37,514. Males had a median income of $32,857 versus $22,274 for females. The per capita income for the county was $18,472. About 16.6% of families and 21.3% of the population were below the poverty line, including 33.9% of those under age 18 and 11.1% of those age 65 or over.

Transportation
The Hot Springs Airport is a county-owned public-use airport located east of Hot Springs.

Politics
Bill Clinton carried this county in 1992; he lost this county by 10% in 1996 to Republican Bob Dole. Clinton is the only Democratic candidate to win this county in the past 54 years. Republican Donald Trump won 72% of the vote here in 2016, the highest margin by any Presidential candidate ever in Sanders County.

Communities

Cities
 Thompson Falls (county seat)
 Population: 1,336

Towns
 Hot Springs
 Population: 557
Plains
 Population: 1,106

Census-designated places

 Belknap
 Population: 161
 Camas
 Population: 57
 Dixon
 Population: 221
 Heron
 Population: 173
 Lonepine
 Population: 177
 Niarada (partial)
 Population: 28
 Noxon
 Population: 255
 Old Agency
 Population: 81
 Paradise
 Population: 166
 Trout Creek
 Population: 277
 Weeksville
 Population: 81

Unincorporated communities

 Bend
 Camas Prairie
 Donlan
 Eddy
 Larchwood
 Perma
 Quinns
 Talc
 Tuscor
 White Pine

See also
 List of lakes in Sanders County, Montana
 List of mountains in Sanders County, Montana
 National Register of Historic Places listings in Sanders County, Montana

References

 
1905 establishments in Montana
Populated places established in 1905